Marivani-ye Kakiha (also Romanized as Marīvānī-ye Kakīhā; also known as Marīvān-e Kahīhā, Marīvān-e Kākīhā, Marīvānī, Mariwāni, and Meriwāni) is a village in Sanjabi Rural District, Kuzaran District, Kermanshah County, Kermanshah Province, Iran. At the 2006 census, its population was 103, in 23 families.

References 

Populated places in Kermanshah County